Štvrtok  is a village and municipality in Trenčín District in the Trenčín Region of north-western Slovakia.

History
In historical records, the village was first mentioned in 1477.

Geography
The municipality lies at an elevation of 202 metres and covers an area of 4.084 km². It has a population of about 368 people.

Trivia

'Štvrtok' is the Slovak word for Thursday. 'Csütörtök' is the Hungarian word for Thursday.

External links
http://www.statistics.sk/mosmis/eng/run.html

Villages and municipalities in Trenčín District